Alan Whitehead is a British musician and businessman. He started his career in the music industry in 1966 as the drummer for Crispian St. Peters, but is best known as a member of Marmalade, whose most successful single in the UK was a cover version of the Paul McCartney song "Ob-La-Di, Ob-La-Da". In 1969, Marmalade were signed to Decca Records and their next song "Reflections of My Life" became a number 10 hit in the US. Whitehead left the band in 1978 and set up his own management company, negotiating his first production contract with EMI Records. Groups that he successfully managed were Lipps Inc., Mel and Kim, Modern Romance and Rikki Peebles. He later went on to manage all girl groups Amazulu and Belle Stars. He also played with a band called The Attack in 1966, featuring guitarist and trumpeter David O'List (later of The Nice with Keith Emerson), Richard Shirman on vocals, Bob Hodges on piano and organ, Gerry Henderson on bass and Alan Whitehead on drums. They released four singles in all, three in 1966 "Try It" / "We Don't Know", "Hi Ho Silver Lining" / "Any More Than We Do", "Created by Clive" / "Colour of my Mind" and one in 1967, "Neville Thumbcatch" / "Lady Orange Peel". Several compilation albums have been produced which featured the band, Magic in the Air in 1990, The Complete Recordings From 1967-68 in 1999, About Time! (The Definitive MOD-POP Collection 1967-1968) and Final Daze in 2019. 

He was married with the Swedish actress Leena Skoog.

He currently runs Chubby Lama Management with Sasi Langford, representing the indie rock band Shoot the Preacher, who won The Global Song Writing Competition. He has also managed strip clubs.

References

British rock drummers
British male drummers
Living people
Year of birth missing (living people)